Mazara del Vallo  is a town and comune in the province of Trapani, southwestern Sicily, Italy. It lies mainly on the left bank at the mouth of the Mazaro river.

It is an agricultural and fishing centre and its port gives shelter to the largest fishing fleet in Italy. Recently it has been a hotspot for migrants from North Africa.

History

Etymology and origins 

Mazara was founded by the Phoenicians in the 9th century BC with the name of Mazar who made it an important mercantile emporium. The discovery of Phoenician vases demonstrate the existence of a Phoenician port built between the 6th and 5th centuries BC. Other evidence is in the palace of the Knights of Malta, where finds show the existence of the ancient Punic trading post. Also a stone slab engraved with a Phoenician inscription found in the channel of the river Màzaro is now preserved in the Museum of the Dancing Satyr.

It then passed under the control of Greeks, Carthaginians, Romans, Vandals, Ostrogoths, Byzantines, before being occupied by the Arabs in the year 827 AD. During the Arab period, Sicily was divided into three different administrative regions, Val di Noto, Val Demone and Val di Mazara, making the city an important commercial harbour and centre of learning. The city centre, known as the Kasbah, retains Arab architectural influences.

In 1072, Mazara was conquered by Normans, headed by Roger I. During that period, in 1093, the Roman Catholic Diocese of Mazara del Vallo was instituted.

After the death of Emperor Frederick II, Sicily passed to the Angevins, then followed by the Catalans of the Aragon Crown. The Aragon period (1282–1409) is characterized by a political, economic and demographic decline of Mazara. The city passed under the control of the House of Savoy in 1713, a reign which lasted only five years, being replaced by the Habsburg Empire (for 16 years) followed by the Bourbons. In 1860 the city was finally conquered by Giuseppe Garibaldi and the Mille, thus joining the then newly formed Kingdom of Italy.

The city was known as Mazzara del Vallo until the World War II period, following which the spelling was changed to Mazara del Vallo.

Today 
Today Mazara is widely considered to be one of the most important fishing centres of Italy; tussles about fishing rights, especially with the North-African countries, figure large in the town's recent history, boat sequestrations being a common event. Currently the fishing business in the city seems to be withering, mainly because of the increasing lack of people willing to work on boats.

Mazara del Vallo is among the Italian cities with the highest percentages of immigrants; it is estimated that the city hosts at least 3,500 registered immigrants, mainly from nearby Tunisia but also the other countries of the Maghreb. They tend to live principally around the old Arab city centre (the Casbah). There exists a local school, managed by the Tunisian government, at which only Arabic and French are taught as languages.  This has led to some controversy. Most of the local schools show openness to Arab culture, even providing Arabic language classes for both Italians and Arabs, and encouraging integration with the autochthonous students. The local city council also provides a seat reserved for a representative of Mazara's immigrant community.

Geography
Mazara borders with the municipalities of Campobello di Mazara, Castelvetrano, Marsala, Petrosino, and Salemi. It counts the hamlets (frazioni) of Borgata Costiera and Mazara Due.

Main sights

The statue is believed to have been sculpted by Greek artist Praxiteles and is now on display to the public in a dedicated museum in the city, after having been on show at the Chamber of Deputies of Rome, and in Aichi, Japan. After this event, the city quickly gained in terms of visiting tourists and a national advertising campaign was mounted with the slogan Mazara del Satiro.

Other attractions include the Norman Arc, that is the remains of the old Norman Castle built in 1073 and demolished in 1880, and a number of churches, including the Royal Saint Nicholas (San Nicolò Regale) Church, a rare example of Norman architecture built in 1124, the Seminary, built in 1710, which surrounds the main local piazza, Piazza della Repubblica, and St. Vitus on the Sea (San Vito a Mare) Church. In honour of St. Vitus, the official patronal saint as well as a native of Mazara del Vallo, the St. Vitus Feast (Lu Fistinu di Santu Vitu) is held every year.

Transportation 
Mazara del Vallo is connected to the rest of Sicily by a regional train service (run by Trenitalia), a private bus service (only to Palermo), and by car, via the A29 highway (also known as Palermo-Mazara del Vallo). It is reachable from Trapani-Birgi Airport by an infrequent bus service or by taxi (€20 per person) and from Palermo by car or taxi.

During the summer period, Mazara is also connected via ferry to the island of Pantelleria and Hammamet, in Tunisia.

International relations 

 
 Santa Pola, Spain
 Mahdia, Tunisia
 Volos, Greece
 Trebisacce, Italy

See also 
Mazara Calcio A.S.D.

References

External links 

Official website
Sicilian Tourist Site

 

Coastal towns in Sicily
Fishing communities in Italy
Mediterranean port cities and towns in Italy
Phoenician colonies in Sicily
Islam in Italy